Walter Germanovich Krivitsky (Ва́льтер Ге́рманович Криви́цкий; June 28, 1899 – February 10, 1941) was a Soviet intelligence officer who revealed plans of signing the Molotov–Ribbentrop Pact after he defected to the West.

Early life
Walter Krivitsky was born on June 28, 1899, to Jewish parents as Samuel Ginsberg in Podwołoczyska, Galicia, Austria-Hungary (now Pidvolochysk, Ukraine), he adopted the name "Krivitsky," which was based on the Slavic root for "crooked, twisted". It was a revolutionary nom de guerre when he entered the Cheka, Bolshevik security and intelligence service.

Espionage

Krivitsky  operated as an illegal resident spy, with false name and papers, in Germany, Poland, Czechoslovakia, Austria, Italy, and Hungary. He rose to the rank of control officer. He is credited with having organised industrial sabotage, stealing plans for submarines and planes, intercepting correspondence between Nazi Germany and Imperial Japan, and recruiting many agents, including Magda Lupescu ("Madame Lepescu") and Noel Field.

In May 1937, Krivitsky was sent to The Hague, Netherlands, to operate as the rezident (regional control officer), operating under the cover of an antiquarian. There he co-ordinated intelligence operations throughout Western Europe.

Defection

At the time, the General Staff of the Red Army was undergoing the Great Purge in Moscow, which Krivitsky and close friend, Ignace Reiss, both abroad, found deeply disturbing. Reiss wanted to defect, but Krivitsky repeatedly held back. Finally, Reiss defected, as he announced in a defiant letter to Moscow. His assassination, in Switzerland, in September 1937 prompted Krivitsky to defect the following month.

In Paris, Krivitsky began to write articles and made contact with Lev Sedov, Trotsky's son, and the Trotskyists. There, he also met undercover Soviet spy Mark Zborowski, known as "Etienne," whom Sedov had sent to protect him. Sedov died mysteriously in February 1938, but Krivitsky eluded attempts to kill or kidnap him in France, including flight to Hyères.

As a result of Krivitsky's debriefing, the British were able to arrest John Herbert King, a cypher clerk in the Foreign Office. He also gave a vague description of two other Soviet spies, Donald Maclean and John Cairncross but without enough detail to enable their arrest. The Soviet intelligence operation in the United Kingdom was thrown into disarray for a time.

Anti-Stalinist activism
At the end of 1938, anticipating the Nazi conquest of Europe, Krivitsky sailed from France to the United States. Krivitsky did not stop with defection; he went on to become an anti-Stalinist.

In Stalin's Secret Service
With the help of journalist Isaac Don Levine and literary agent Paul Wohl, Krivitsky produced an inside account of Stalin's underhanded methods. It appeared in book form as In Stalin's Secret Service (UK title: I Was Stalin's Agent), published on November 15, 1939, after appearing first in sensational serial form in April 1939 in the top magazine of the time, the Saturday Evening Post. (The title had appeared as a phrase in an article written by Reiss's wife on the first anniversary of her husband's assassination: "Reiss... had been in Stalin's secret service for many years and knew what fate to expect.") The book received a tepid review by the very influential New York Times. Attacked by the American left, Krivitsky was vindicated when the German-Soviet Nonaggression Pact, which he had predicted, was signed in August 1939.

Testimony
Torn between his dedication to socialist ideals and growing detestation of Stalinism, Krivitsky believed that it was his duty to inform. That decision caused him much mental anguish, as he impressed on American defector Whittaker Chambers, to whom Krivitsky stated, "In our time, informing is a duty" (recounted by Chambers in his autobiography, Witness).

Krivitsky testified before the Dies Committee (later to become the House Un-American Activities Committee) in October 1939, and sailed as "Walter Thomas" to London in January 1940 to be debriefed by Jane Archer (Jane Sissmore) of British domestic counterintelligence, MI5. In doing so, he revealed much about Soviet espionage. It is a matter of controversy whether he gave MI5 clues to the identity of Soviet agents Donald Maclean and Kim Philby. It is certain, however, that Lavrenty Beria, the head of the People's Commissariat for Internal Affairs (NKVD), learned of Krivitsky's testimony and ordered operations to assassinate him.

Death

Krivitsky soon returned to North America, landing in Canada. Always in trouble with the U.S. Immigration and Naturalization Service, Krivitsky was not able to return there until November 1940. Krivitsky retained Louis Waldman to represent him on legal matters. (Waldman was a long-time friend of Isaac Don Levine.) Meanwhile, the assassination of Trotsky in Mexico on August 21, 1940, convinced him that he was now at the top of the NKVD hit list. His last two months in New York were filled with plans to settle in Virginia and to write but also with doubts and dread.

On February 10, 1941, at 9:30 a.m., Krivitsky was found dead in the Bellevue Hotel (now Kimpton George Hotel) in Washington, DC, by a chambermaid, with three suicide notes by the bed. His body was lying in a pool of blood, caused by a single bullet wound to the right temple from a .38 caliber revolver found grasped in Krivitsky's right hand. A report dated June 10, 1941, indicates he had been dead for approximately six hours.

According to many sources (including Krivitsky himself), he was murdered by Soviet intelligence, but the official investigation, unaware of the NKVD manhunt, concluded that Krivitsky committed suicide. People with close ties to Krivitsky later recounted opposite interpretations of his death:

 Suicide, Reiss' wife wrote in 1969:  

 Assassination, Chambers wrote in 1952:  

Inconclusive, Victor Serge wrote in 1944:

Inconclusive, William J. Hood, former CIA head of counterintelligence, wrote in 1984:

Speculation persists into the 21st century. For example, in 2017, Anthony Percy's book Misdefending the Realm (Buckingham: University of Buckingham Press, 2017) argued that Krivitsky was the UK's most important source on Soviet plan, did not receive action from MI5 on the intelligence that he supplied, and was assassinated by Soviet intelligence after Guy Burgess informed Soviet superiors about him. The assassination, Percy argues, cleared the threat of exposure of the Cambridge Five and other moles.

Survivors
At the first news of his death, Whittaker Chambers found Krivitsky's wife, Antonina ("Tonia" according to Kern, "Tonya" according to Chambers) and son Alek in New York City. He brought them by train to Florida, where they stayed with Chambers's family, which had already fled New Smyrna. Both families hid there several months, fearing further Soviet reprisals. The families then returned to Chambers's farm in Westminster, Maryland. Within a short time, however, Tonia and Alek returned to New York.

His wife and son both lived in poverty for the rest of their lives. Alek died of a brain tumor in his early 30s after he had served in the United States Navy and studied at Columbia University. Tonia, who changed her surname legally to "Thomas", continued to live and work in New York City until she retired to Ossining, where she died at 94 in 1996 in a nursing home.

Works

 In Stalin's Secret Service (1939) (second edition 1939, 1979, 1985, 2000)
 Agent de Staline (French, 1940)
 Byłem agentem Stalina (Polish, 1964)
 Я был агентом Сталина. Записки советского разведчика (Russian, 1991)
 Rusia en España (Spanish, 1939)
 MI5 Debriefing & Other Documents on Soviet Intelligence (2004)

See also
 List of Eastern Bloc defectors
 List of KGB defectors

References

Sources

 –

 

1899 births
1941 deaths
1941 suicides
Austro-Hungarian Jews
Bolsheviks
Death conspiracy theories
Germany–Soviet Union relations
GRU officers
Jews from Galicia (Eastern Europe)
Jewish anti-communists
Jewish socialists
Molotov–Ribbentrop Pact
People from Ternopil Oblast
People from the Kingdom of Galicia and Lodomeria
Russian anti-communists
Russian Jews
Soviet intelligence personnel who defected to the United States
Soviet Jews in the military
Soviet spies
Suicides by firearm in Washington, D.C.
Ukrainian Jews